Mark Lorenzen (born 1965) is a video game designer and entrepreneur.

Biography
Lorenzen was born in Virginia. He got primary education from Huntington Beach High School, and later attended Point Loma Nazarene University, finishing with a Bachelor's Degree in Visual Art.

Career
Lorenzen first entered the video game industry by joining Blue Sky Software in the early 90s. While there, he served as design director on such games as Jurassic Park, Vectorman and Ren & Stimpy: Stimpy's Invention. 

After leaving Blue Sky in 1995 Lorenzen joined Shiny Entertainment, working on Earthworm Jim 2. One of the levels he designed was named "Lorenzen's Soil" in his honor. 

In 1996 a handful of Shiny members formed The Neverhood, Inc. (further history could be read here). The Neverhood included mark's brother Tim, who worked at 7th Level. Lorenzen later led art design on The Neverhood, Inc.-made Skullmonkeys, and programming on BoomBots.

In 1999 The Neverhood, Inc. disbanded, and Lorenzen with four partners formed the game company Monkeytropolis, based in Rancho Santa Margarita, California. The company was active for 3 years, working on various projects, both internal and for outside publishers. Monkeytropolis disbanded in 2002.

In April 2002, Lorenzen joined Electronic Arts, to work as software engineer on various real-time strategy games such as Command & Conquer: Generals and The Lord of the Rings: The Battle for Middle-earth.

In 2005, Lorenzen moved to Utah, working for EA Salt Lake on Tiger Woods PGA Tour 07, Nerf N-Strike Elite and on various titles in the Electronic Arts The Sims 3 franchise. 

In January 2014, Pencil Test Studios announced that Lorenzen was working as the lead programmer on their upcoming Armikrog game.

In 2015, Lorenzen was hired at GALXYZ Inc. as principal designer and developer of a Science Education app called Blue Apprentice.

in 2017, Lorenzen served as senior 3D developer at Telltale Games.

Game credits

Personal life

Mark Lorenzen is married to Jodi Lorenzen. He is based in Utah.

References

External links
MobyGames profile
Monkeytropolis's team (archived)
Facebook page

1966 births
American video game designers
American video game programmers
21st-century American businesspeople
Living people
Point Loma Nazarene University alumni
People from Huntington Beach, California
Video game artists